Jade Ulutule (née Le Pesq, born 12 October 1992) is a French rugby sevens player.

Biography 
Ulutule played for the Auckland Storm in the 2012 Women's Provincial Championship in New Zealand.

Ulutule was selected as a member of the France women's national rugby sevens team to the 2016 Summer Olympics. She was part of the French team that won the 2018 Six Nations Championship. She also competed at the 2020 Summer Olympics and won a silver medal.

In 2021, She played for the French fifteens team at the Six Nations Championship. She was in the starting line-up when they routed Ireland 56–15. She also featured in their defeat to England in the Six Nations title match.

Ulutule captained the side that won a bronze medal at the 2022 Rugby World Cup Sevens in Cape Town.

References

External links 
 
 
 
 

1992 births
Living people
People from Fécamp
Female rugby sevens players
France international rugby sevens players
Sportspeople from Seine-Maritime
French female rugby union players
Olympic rugby sevens players of France
Rugby sevens players at the 2016 Summer Olympics
Rugby sevens players at the 2020 Summer Olympics
Medalists at the 2020 Summer Olympics
Olympic silver medalists for France
Olympic medalists in rugby sevens
France international women's rugby sevens players